The University of California Press, otherwise known as UC Press, is a publishing house associated with the University of California that engages in academic publishing. It was founded in 1893 to publish scholarly and scientific works by faculty of the University of California, established 25 years earlier in 1868, and has been officially headquartered at the university's flagship campus in Berkeley, California, since its inception.

As the non-profit publishing arm of the University of California system, the UC Press is fully subsidized by the university and the State of California. A third of its authors are faculty members of the university. The press publishes over 250 new books and almost four dozen multi-issue journals annually, in the humanities, social sciences, and natural sciences, and maintains approximately 4,000 book titles in print. It is also the digital publisher of Collabra and Luminos open access (OA) initiatives.

The University of California Press publishes in the following subjects: African studies, American studies, ancient world (classics), anthropology, art, Asian studies, communication, criminology & criminal justice, economics, environmental studies, film & media studies, food & wine, gender & sexuality, global studies, health, history, language, Latin American studies, literary studies & poetry, Middle Eastern studies, music, philosophy, politics, psychology, religion, sciences, and sociology.

The press has its administrative office in downtown Oakland, California, an editorial branch office in Los Angeles, and a sales office in New York, and distributes through marketing offices in Great Britain, Asia, Australia, and Latin America. A Board consisting of senior officers of the University of California, headquartered in Berkeley, holds responsibility for the operations of the press, and authorizes and approves all manuscripts for publication. The Editorial Committee consists of distinguished faculty members representing the university's nine campuses.

The press commissioned as its corporate typeface University of California Old Style from type designer Frederic Goudy from 1936 to 1938, although it no longer always uses the design.

Notable books 
Language As Symbolic Action, Kenneth Burke (1966)
The Teachings of Don Juan: A Yaqui Way of Knowledge, Carlos Castaneda (1968)
Technicians of the Sacred: A Range of Poetries from Africa, America, Asia, Europe and Oceania, Jerome Rothenberg (1968; 50th anniversary edition 2017)
The Mysterious Stranger, Mark Twain (definitive edition) (1969, based on work first published in 1916)
Basic Color Terms: Their Universality and Evolution (1969)
The Making of a Counter Culture, Theodore Roszak (1970)
Self-Consuming Artifacts: The Experience of Seventeenth-Century Literature, Stanley Fish (1972)
The Ancient Economy, Moses I. Finley (1973)
Joan of Arc: The Image of Female Heroism, Marina Warner (1981)
Caring: A Feminine Approach to Ethics and Moral Education, Nel Noddings (1984, 2nd edition 2003)
Strong Democracy: Participatory Politics for a New Age, Benjamin R. Barber (1984)
Art in the San Francisco Bay Area, Thomas Albright (1985)
Religious Experience, Wayne Proudfoot (1985)
The War Within: America's Battle over Vietnam, Tom Wells (1994)
George Grosz: An Autobiography, George Grosz (translated by Nora Hodges) (published 1998, written in 1946, translated in 1955)
Disposable People: New Slavery in the Global Economy, Kevin Bales (1999)
Mama Lola: A Vodou Priestess in Brooklyn, Karen McCarthy Brown (2001)
A Culture of Conspiracy: Apocalyptic Visions in Contemporary America, Michael Barkun (2003)
Beyond Chutzpah: On the Misuse of Anti-Semitism and the Abuse of History, Norman G. Finkelstein (2005)
Autobiography of Mark Twain: Volume One, Mark Twain (2010)
Revival from Below: The Deoband Movement and Global Islam, Brannon D. Ingram (2018)
Perfecting Women: Maulana Ashraf Ali Thanawi's Bihishti Zewar, Barbara D. Metcalf (1992)

Open access (OA) programs at UC Press 
 Collabra
Collabra is University of California Press's open access journal program. The Collabra program currently publishes two open access journals, Collabra: Psychology and Elementa: Science of the Anthropocene, with plans for continued expansion and journal acquisition.

 Luminos
Luminos is University of California Press's open access response to the challenged monograph landscape. With the same high standards for selection, peer review, production, and marketing as its traditional book publishing program, Luminos is a transformative model, built as a partnership where costs and benefits are shared.

Notable series 
The University of California Press re-printed a number of novels under the California Fiction series from 1996 to 2001. These titles were selected for their literary merit and for their illumination of California history and culture. 
The Ford by Mary Austin
Thieves' Market by A.I. Bezzerides
Disobedience by Michael Drinkard
Words of My Roaring by Ernest J. Finney
Skin Deep by Guy Garcia
Fat City by Leonard Gardiner
Chez Chance by Jay Gummerman
Continental Drift by James D. Houston
The Vineyard by Idwal Jones
In the Heart of the Valley of Love by Cynthia Kadohata
Always Coming Home by Ursula K. Le Guin
The Valley of the Moon by Jack London
Home and Away by Joanne Meschery
Bright Web in the Darkness by Alexander Saxton
Golden Days by Carolyn See
Oil! by Upton Sinclair
Understand This by Jervey Tervalon
Ghost Woman by Lawrence Thornton
Who Is Angelina? by Al Young

See also

 List of English-language book publishing companies
 List of university presses

References

Further reading

External links 
 
 Frugé, August. A Skeptic Among Scholars: August Frugé on University Publishing. Berkeley: University of California Press, c1993 1993. 
 California Digital Library (CDL) – University of California Libraries
 Free Online - UC Press E-Books Collection
 Mark Twain Project Online
 "Mark Twain's Biography Flying Off the Shelves", The New York Times, Nov. 19, 2010

 
1893 establishments in California
Book publishing companies based in California
Publishing companies based in Berkeley, California
Publishing companies established in 1893
Press
California